Hall is a populated area, a socken (not to be confused with parish), on the Swedish island of Gotland. It comprises the same area as the administrative Hall District, established on 1January 2016.

Geography 
Hall is situated on the north coast of Gotland. The medieval Hall Church is located in the socken. On the coast is also Hallshuk, sometimes called Hall, fishing village with the Hallshuk Chapel, built by Queen Christina in 1645, to be used by the fishermen working in the area. , Hall Church and Hallshuk Chapel belongs to Forsa parish in Norra Gotlands pastorat, along with the churches in Lärbro, Hellvi and Hangvar.

Along the northwest and north coast of Hall is the Hall-Hangvar nature reserve. The reserve was established in 1967 and expanded in 1999.

References

External links 

Objects from Hall at the Digital Museum by Nordic Museum

Populated places in Gotland County